Jean-Marie Speich is a French prelate of the Catholic Church who has worked in the diplomatic service of the Holy See since 1986. He has been an archbishop since 2013 and Apostolic Nuncio to Slovenia and Apostolic Delegate to Kosovo since March 2019.

Biography
Speich was born on 15 June 1955 in Strasbourg, France, to Xavier Speich and Marie Thérèse Goetz, residents of Willgottheim (Bas-Rhin). His sister Andrée Speich is a cloistered Benedictine nun.

Speich was ordained to the priesthood on 9 October 1982, by Bishop Léon Arthur Elchinger. From 1982 to 1984, he served as assistant pastor at St. Vincent de Paul Parish in the Archdiocese of Strasbourg. To prepare for a diplomatic career he entered the Pontifical Ecclesiastical Academy in 1984. 

He entered the diplomatic service of the Holy See on 1 July 1986 and was assigned to Apostolic Nunciatures of the Holy See in Haiti, Nigeria, Bolivia, Canada, Germany, the United Kingdom, Egypt, Spain and Cuba. On 27 March 2008, he became head of the section for French-speaking countries at the Secretariat of State.

On 17 August 2013, Pope Francis named Speich Apostolic Nuncio to Ghana and titular archbishop of Sulci. He received his episcopal consecration from Pope Francis on 24 October.

On 19 March 2019, Pope Francis appointed him Apostolic Nuncio to Slovenia and Apostolic Delegate to Kosovo.

Speich's academic degrees include a doctorate degree in canon law, and a licentiate in sacred theology, both from the Pontifical Gregorian University.

The Speich family coat of arms dates to the first half of the 13th century. Speich assumed the motto of Speich family of Strasbourg, which has been in use since 1415. This motto, "", which is in Alemannic German and means "As I can".

Honours 
Ecclesiastical
 Chaplain of His Holiness, 15 October 1988.
 Honorary Prelate of His Holiness, 10 November 1998.

Others
 National Order of Honour and Merit of Haiti, Commander, 2 August 1989.
 Order of Merit of the Federal Republic of Germany, Commander, 24 February 1999.
 Sovereign Military Order of Malta, Conventual Chaplain ad honorem, 24 June 2006.
 Legion of Honor of the Republic of France, Knight, 1 January 2010.
 Dynastic Order of Saints Maurice and Lazarus of the House of Savoy, Grand Officer, 14 September 2013.

Notes

See also
 List of heads of the diplomatic missions of the Holy See

References 
 

1955 births
Living people
20th-century French Roman Catholic priests
Commanders Crosses of the Order of Merit of the Federal Republic of Germany
Apostolic Nuncios to Ghana
Apostolic Nuncios to Slovenia
Apostolic Nuncios to Kosovo
Pontifical Gregorian University alumni
Pontifical Ecclesiastical Academy alumni
21st-century Roman Catholic titular archbishops